Zygaena fausta is a member of the family Zygaenidae, the day-flying burnet moths. Its bright aposematic colours of red, white and black on the wings indicate to possible predators such as birds that it is foul tasting or poisonous. In flight, the bright red abdomen is revealed, contrasting with the white legs and black head and antennae; the thorax is black and white with an eye spot on each side (see image). There appears to be a considerable variation in pattern among specimens from different parts of Europe.

The southwest of Europe is home to Zygaena fausta. The moth can be found from Spain and Southern Portugal to Western Austria and Southern Germany, northeast to Thuringia, and southeast to North-western Italy.

It is rare or absent from Britain, the Netherlands and Belgium, where related species include the similarly aposematic five-spot burnet and the six-spot burnet.

The caterpillar (larva) is dark grey with a black line above a line of white interrupted by yellow bands. The caterpillar's food plants are vetches of the genus Coronilla.

The adults often visit a wide range of flowers including knapweed and eryngo. Typical habitat is dry chalk grassland. Adults fly throughout the summer from April or May until October. The sexes are similar but not identical (see image); mating takes place by day on isolated plants.

Subspecies
Zygaena fausta fausta
Zygaena fausta agilis Reiss, 1932
Zygaena fausta alpiummicans Verity, 1926
Zygaena fausta baetica Rambur, 1839
Zygaena fausta fassnidgei Tremewan & Manley, 1965
Zygaena fausta faustina Ochsenheimer, 1808
Zygaena fausta fernan Agenjo, 1948
Zygaena fausta fina Burgeff, 1956
Zygaena fausta fortunata Rambur, 1866
Zygaena fausta gibraltarica Tremewan, 1961
Zygaena fausta jucunda Meisner, 1818
Zygaena fausta junceae Oberthur, 1884
Zygaena fausta lacrymans Burgeff, 1914
Zygaena fausta murciensis Reiss, 1922
Zygaena fausta preciosa Reiss, 1920
Zygaena fausta suevica Reiss, 1920

References

External links
Lepiforum.de

Zygaena
Aposematic species
Moths of Europe
Moths described in 1767
Taxa named by Carl Linnaeus